Chris Ryder (born August 22, 1980 in Aylesbury) is a professional squash player who represents England. He reached a career-high world ranking of World No. 33 in October 2008.

References

External links 
 
 

English male squash players
Living people
1980 births
Sportspeople from Aylesbury